Heinz Schlaffer (born 21 June 1939 in Černošín) is a Germanist and Professor of Literary Science of the University of Stuttgart.  He is best known for essays like "Die kurze Geschichte der deutschen Literatur" (The Short History of German Literature).

Life 
Schlaffer received his first Literary Science Professorship at the Philipp's University – Marburg and changed to Stuttgart in 1975.  He held the teaching position in that town from 1975 until his emeritus in 2004.

He published numerous Books, among others about Lyrik im Realismus (Poetry in Realism), Der Bürger als Held (The Townspeople as Heroes), aesthetic histories, Goethe's Faust, Poesie und Wissen (Poetry and Knowledge), besides scientific writings like essays and literary criticisms in Tageszeitung.

Selected works
 Das entfesselte Wort : Nietzsches Stil und seine Folgen (The Aroused Word: Nietzsche's Style and his Successors). Hanser, München 2007
 Poesie und Wissen : die Entstehung des ästhetischen Bewusstseins und der philologischen Erkenntnis (Poems and Knowledge: The Origins of Aesthetic Consciousness and the Philosophical Insight). Suhrkamp, Frankfurt am Main 2005
 Die kurze Geschichte der deutschen Literatur (The Short History of German Literature). Hanser, München ; Wien 2002
 Faust zweiter Teil : die Allegorie des 19. Jahrhunderts (Faust Part II: The Allegory of the 19th Century). Metzler, Stuttgart 1989
 Der Bürger als Held : sozialgeschichtliche Auflösungen literarischer Widersprüche (The Townspeople as Heroes: Social-Historical Solutions of Literary Contradictions). Suhrkamp, Frankfurt (am Main) 1973
 Lyrik im Realismus : Studien über Raum und Zeit in den Gedichten (Poetry in Realism: Studies about Time and Place in Poems) Mörikes, the Droste and Liliencrons. – Würzburg 1966

Selected awards 
 2008 Heinrich Mann Prize for Essays of the Berliner Akademie der Künste

References

External links 
 Literature by and on Heinz Schlaffer in the Catalog of the German National Library
 Perlentaucher über den Autor, Kurzrezensionen seiner Werke (Perlentaucher about the Author, Short Review of his Works) (German)

1939 births
Germanists
Living people
Heinrich Mann Prize winners